Brian Woodward (12 July 1929 – 11 October 2014) was an English former professional footballer who played as a striker in the Football League for York City, in non-League football for Hereford United and was on the books of Leeds United without making a league appearance.

References

1929 births
2014 deaths
Footballers from Leeds
English footballers
Association football forwards
Leeds United F.C. players
Hereford United F.C. players
York City F.C. players
English Football League players